Sherzod Azamov (born 14 January 1990) is an Uzbekistani footballer who plays as a defender for Uzbekistan Super League team Pakhtakor.

An international player for Uzbekistan since 2016, he also have played for Uzbekistan youth teams and played in the 2009 FIFA U-20 World Cup.

Honours

References

External links 
 Stats in National Football Team

Living people
1990 births
Uzbekistani footballers
Uzbekistan international footballers
Pakhtakor Tashkent FK players
Association football defenders
Footballers at the 2010 Asian Games
Asian Games competitors for Uzbekistan